St John the Baptist's Church is a redundant Anglican church in the village of Sutterby, Lincolnshire, England.  It is recorded in the National Heritage List for England as a designated Grade II listed building, and is under the care of the Friends of Friendless Churches.

History

The church dates from the 12th century with additions in the 14th century.  A south porch was added in 1743.  It was declared redundant by the Diocese of Lincoln in August 1972, and gifted as a monument in March 1981.  It was taken into the care of the charity, the Friends of Friendless Churches, who has held the freehold from 3 July 1981.  Major repairs were carried out in 2002, and more repairs are being undertaken in 2010.

Architecture

St John's is a simple building in one storey.  It is constructed in greenstone with some brick patching, and has slate roofs.  Its plan consists of a nave with a south porch, and a narrower chancel.  In the west wall is a blocked window.  The north wall contains a blocked 12th-century round-arched doorway and a blocked rectangular window.  In the east wall is a four-light window with trefoil heads, and there is a similar two-light window in the south wall of the chancel.  The south wall of the nave is supported by a brick buttress, to the left of which is a two-light window dating from the 14th century. The porch is gabled and has a 14th-century ogee-arched doorway.  Internally, the furniture includes a 14th-century font in Decorated style with carved tracery on its sides, an 18th-century pulpit which is in a collapsed condition, and what remains of a 19th-century screen.

References

External links 

 

12th-century church buildings in England
14th-century church buildings in England
Grade II listed churches in Lincolnshire
Churches preserved by the Friends of Friendless Churches